Tomatidine is an anabolic chemical compound that prevents muscle wasting. It is naturally found in leaves of tomatoes and green tomatoes. Chemically, it is the aglycone of tomatine.  It has been shown to have multiple health benefits. Tomatidine is an inhibitor of skeletal muscle atrophy, and a potential therapeutic agent for aging-associated sarcopenia, reducing weakness and atrophy in aged skeletal muscle by interaction with the ATF4 (a critical mediator of age-related muscle weakness and atrophy).

Dietary supplementation with ∼0.04% tomatidine for 10 weeks reduces plasma cholesterol and atherosclerosis in ApoE-deficient mice without evidence of toxicity.

Research  
It is investigated as compound to increase longevity and it increased lifespan and healthspan of C. elegans. It is also investigated in osteoporosis.

See also 
 Ursolic acid

References 

Heterocyclic compounds with 5 rings
Piperidines
Oxygen heterocycles
Spiro compounds